Tower International is a manufacturer of automotive structural metal components and assemblies primarily serving original equipment manufacturers (“OEMs”). Tower International supply body-structure stampings, frame and other chassis structures, and complex welded assemblies for small and large cars, crossovers, pickups, and sport utility vehicles.

Headquartered in Livonia, Michigan, the company generated revenues of $2.0 billion in 2017. Their products are manufactured at 23 facilities, located near customers in North America and Europe. Tower supports the manufacturing operations through six engineering and sales locations around the world.

History
Tower International was formed in 1993, however many of the engineering and manufacturing operations date back further. A.O. Smith Automotive Products Company, which was acquired by Tower International in 1997, has roots dating back to the early days of the automotive industry. The 1903 Cadillac was produced on the first steel frame which was invented by A.O. Smith. In the 1920s their first fully automatic frame line with adjustable riveting robots became known as a “Mechanical Marvel”. On October 15, 2010, Tower International common stock began trading on the New York Stock Exchange following the initial public offering (“IPO”).

Products
Tower International provides stampings, structures and assemblies.

Body Structures 

Integral components forming the upper-body structure of the vehicle.

Class A Products 

Large stampings which require flawless surface finishes.

Chassis Structures 

Products forming the basic lower-body structure of the vehicle.

Complex Assemblies 

Complex assemblies representing major portions of a vehicle’s body structure.

Non-Automotive 

Manufacturing of metal structures for other industries.

Locations

Tower is headquartered in Livonia, Michigan.  The 23 production facilities are supported by 6 engineering and sales locations.

References

Companies listed on the New York Stock Exchange
Auto parts suppliers of the United States
Livonia, Michigan
Companies based in Wayne County, Michigan
Economy of Michigan